The 1967 Jacksonville State Gamecocks football team represented Jacksonville State University as a member of the Alabama Collegiate Conference (ACC) during the 1967 NAIA football season. Led by third-year head coach Jim Blevins, the Gamecocks compiled an overall record of 4–5–1 with a mark of 1–1–1 in conference play.

Schedule

References

Jacksonville State
Jacksonville State Gamecocks football seasons
Jacksonville State Gamecocks football